Cyrtorhinus is a genus of plant bugs in the family Miridae. There are at least three described species in Cyrtorhinus.

Species
 Cyrtorhinus caricis (Fallén, 1807)
 Cyrtorhinus fulvus Knight, 1935
 Cyrtorhinus lividipennis Reuter, 1884

References

Further reading

 
 
 

Miridae genera
Orthotylini